Events in the year 1916 in India.

Incumbents
 Emperor of India – George V
 Viceroy of India – Charles Hardinge, 1st Baron Hardinge of Penshurst 
 Viceroy of India – Frederic Thesiger, 1st Viscount Chelmsford (from 4 April)

Events
 National income - 17,087 million
 Indian National Congress Party hammer out an alliance – the Lucknow Pact – with All-India Muslim League

Law
Indian Medical Degrees Act
Hindu Disposition of Property Act

Births
13 February – Jagjit Singh Aurora,  military commander (died 2005).
21 March – Bismillah Khan, shehnai musician and Bharat Ratna winner (died 2006).
23 March – Harkishan Singh Surjeet, former General Secretary of the Communist Party of India (Marxist) (died 2008).
8 May – Chinmayananda, spiritual leader (died 1993).
16 September – M. S. Subbulakshmi, Carnatic singer (died 2004).
25 September – Deen Dayal Upadhyaya, RSS (died 1968)
12 December - Maharaj Charan Singh, Fourth Satguru of Radha Soami Satsang Beas (died 1 June 1990).

Full date unknown
Kanan Devi, actress and singer (died 1992).

Deaths

References

 
India
Years of the 20th century in India